Chadakori is a village and rural commune in Niger.
Also the birthplace of Mahamane Manirou Daouda.

References

Communes of Maradi Region